Events in the year 1969 in Turkey.

Parliament
 13th Parliament of Turkey (up to 12 October)
 14th Parliament of Turkey

Incumbents
President – Cevdet Sunay
Prime Minister – Süleyman Demirel
Leader of the opposition – İsmet İnönü

Ruling party and the main opposition
  Ruling party – Justice Party (AP)
  Main opposition – Republican People's Party (CHP)

Cabinet
30th government of Turkey (up to 3 November)  
31st government of Turkey (from 3 November)

Events
 9 February – Alparslan Türkeş ̧ elected chairman of the Nationalist Movement Party.
 15/16 February – Protests against the visiting United States Sixth Fleet
 28 March – Earthquake in Alaşehir
 8 April – Widespread student demonstrations
 12 April – Atatürk Cultural Center opens.
 3 May – Demonstrations at the funeral of Court of Cassation.
 25 May – Galatasaray wins the Turkish championship.
 31 May – Istanbul University closes following civil unrest.
 11 August – Bülent Ecevit says that the soil belongs to people who cultivate it and water to people who use it.
 12 October – 1969 Turkish general election results in AP 260 seats, CHP 144 seats, GP 14 seats, MP 6 seats, BP 7 seats, YTP 3 seats, TİP 2 seats, MHP 1 seat and Independents 11 seats
 18 December – The battleship TCG Yavuz sold for scrapping.

Births
12 March – Beyazıt Öztürk, television personality
29 April – İzel Çeliköz, singer
29 May – Acun Ilıcalı, television personality 
7 July – Metin Feyzioğlu, academician, lawyer
9 December – Ayşe Arman, journalist

Deaths
 5 April – Yusuf Kemal Tengirşenk (aged 91), politician
 21 May – Kamil Ocak (aged 55), politician
 24 October – Behçet Kemal Çağlar (aged 61), poet
 3 November – Zeki Rıza Sporel (aged 81), footballer

Gallery

See also
 1968–69 1.Lig

References

 
Years of the 20th century in Turkey
Turkey
Turkey
Turkey